The Gandhipuram Central Bus Terminus, commonly known as the Gandhipuram Bus Terminus, is a bus terminus in Coimbatore that serves intercity buses.

History
In Coimbatore, town buses started operating in 1921 to serve most parts of the city, as well as other towns and villages in the district. A central bus terminus was started in 1974 in Gandhipuram. Due to increases in population and vehicular traffic, additional bus terminals were created in Ukkadam, Singanallur and Saibaba Colony. At the current situation, northbound and eastbound buses from the city use this bus terminal. It is located centrally in the city.

Services
Bus service includes inter-city and intra-city buses that connect Coimbatore operate from different bus stands.

Gandhipuram Central Bus stand
Gandhipuram Central Bus Stand is the bus terminal for northeast-bound and northbound buses towards Salem, Erode, Dharmapuri, Hosur, Namakkal, Gobichettipalayam, Sathyamangalam, Mettupalayam, and Tirupur, and eastbound buses towards Dharapuram and Karur, among others. There are 119 inter-city routes operated by the Coimbatore division with more than 500 buses.

Thiruvalluvar Bus Stand
The Thiruvallavur Bus Stand is located near the Gandhipuram bus terminus and is serviced by SETC, Kerala State Road Transport Corporation, and the Karnataka State Road Transport Corporation.

Other Termini

Connections
The terminus is connected to all the 
major places within the city such as:

Town Hall - 3.1 km
Coimbatore Integrated Bus Terminus - 12.8 km
Ukkadam Bus Terminus - 4.1 km
Singanallur Bus Terminus - 9.5 km
Saibaba Colony Bus Terminus - 3.3 km
Coimbatore Junction - 2.3 km
Podanur Junction - 9 km
Coimbatore International Airport - 10.7 km.

References

Bus stations in Coimbatore
Transport in Coimbatore